"Do You Love as Good as You Look" is a song written by Jerry Gillespie, Charlie Black and Rory Bourke, and recorded by American country music duo The Bellamy Brothers.  It was released in January 1981 as the second single from the album Sons of the Sun.  The song was The Bellamy Brothers fourth number one single on the country charts.  The single stayed at number one for one week and spent a total of nine weeks on the country chart.

Chart performance

References 

1981 singles
1980 songs
The Bellamy Brothers songs
Songs written by Rory Bourke
Songs written by Jerry Gillespie
Warner Records singles
Curb Records singles
Songs written by Charlie Black